Plosca may refer to the following places in Romania:

 Plosca, a commune in Teleorman County
 Plosca, a village in the commune Bistreț, Dolj County
 Plosca, a village in the commune Teliucu Inferior, Hunedoara County
 Plosca (river), a tributary of the Amaradia in Gorj and Dolj Counties